Zhao Rui (born February 21, 1991, in Harbin) is a Chinese pair skater. She competes with An Yang. They were the 2006 Chinese national champions.

External links
 

1991 births
Living people
Chinese female pair skaters
Figure skaters from Harbin